Elections of the excepted hereditary peers were held in October and November 1999, before the House of Lords Act 1999 excluded most hereditary peers from the membership of the House of Lords allowing Earl Marshal, Lord Great Chamberlain and 90 others to remain in the House.

Until November 2002, vacancies among the elected hereditary peers were filled by hereditary peers who received most votes in the 1999 elections without being elected to remain. Since November 2002, by-elections have been held to fill vacancies.

Election by the whole House
15 excepted hereditary peers were elected by the whole House in an election held from 27 to 28 October 1999. 1,115 members of the House were eligible to vote and 631 valid votes were cast. The result was as follows:

Elections by groups
75 excepted hereditary peers were elected by hereditary peers of three parties and crossbenchers in elections held from 3 to 4 November 1999.

Conservatives
42 excepted hereditary peers were elected by the Conservative hereditary peers. 241 peers were eligible to vote and 204 valid votes were cast. The result was as follows:

Crossbenchers
28 excepted hereditary peers were elected by the crossbench hereditary peers. 131 peers were eligible to vote and 105 valid votes were cast. The result was as follows:

Liberal Democrats
3 excepted hereditary peers were elected by the Liberal Democrat hereditary peers. All 20 peers who were eligible to vote cast their votes. The result was as follows:

Labour
2 excepted hereditary peers were elected by the Labour hereditary peers. 18 peers were eligible to vote and 17 valid votes were cast. The result was as follows:

See also
By-elections to the House of Lords
List of hereditary peers elected under the House of Lords Act 1999
List of hereditary peers in the House of Lords by virtue of a life peerage

References

hereditary
House of Lords